Adrien Zeller (2 April 1940 – 22 August 2009) was State Secretary of the Social Security in the second Jacques Chirac government from 1986 to 1988. He was the president of the regional council of Alsace from 1996 until 2009. He was a member of the Union for a Popular Movement. He was born in Saverne, and died aged 69 of a heart attack in Haguenau.

He was a graduate of the College of Europe in Bruges (promotion of 1965–1966).

References

1940 births
2009 deaths
People from Saverne
Centre of Social Democrats politicians
Union for French Democracy politicians
Union for a Popular Movement politicians
Politicians of the French Fifth Republic
College of Europe alumni
Officers of the Ordre national du Mérite
Recipients of the Order of Merit of the Federal Republic of Germany